The Farsund shooting was a fatal shooting incident that took place at a shooting range in Farsund, Norway, on 20 August 1988. Four people were shot and killed with a shotgun, and two were injured. Two of the killed were paramedics who arrived at the scene some time after the first shootings.

Perpetrator and victims
The perpetrator was identified as a 23-year-old man with a mental disorder. No obvious motives were behind the killings. He was described as a weapon-interested "lone wolf". who owned a large number of weapons. He used slugs and buckshot during the shooting, a type of ammunition that is banned in Norway.

In 1989, the offender, who was considered insane when committing the shooting, was sentenced to ten years of involuntary confinement at a psychiatric institution. The doctors that testified in the trial stated that he had had schizophrenia since his early teenage years. In 1999, he was sentenced to an additional five years.

Those killed were Per Odd Reite, 42; Bjørn Halvorsen, 22; Gunnar Eliassen, 31; and Geir Olav Lundtræ, 24 (the latter two were paramedics). Kjell Stillufsen and Gunnar Gabrielsen escaped the shooting with minor injuries.

Aftermath
One of the incident's repercussions was that ambulance personnel were equipped with radios while they were in the field. The incident also helped to uncover deficiencies in the security equipment used by the Norwegian police, and in particular the small number of bulletproof vests that were available to local police. Studies showed that there was just one bulletproof vest available per local police station (Norwegian:Lensmannskontor; similar to sheriff's office) in 1988. The debate that arose led to the Ministry of Justice acquiring 800 new vests during the fall that were sent to smaller police stations all over the country.

Furthermore, the incident changed the operating practice in terms of how health professionals should proceed in similar situations. For instance, ambulance workers will not be dispatched to a venue before the area has been secured by the police.

References

Deaths by firearm in Norway
Shooting
1988 in Norway
Mass shootings in Norway